Tian Ye (born 29 July 1982 in Heilongjiang) is a Chinese cross-country skier and biathlete.

He participated as a cross-country skier at the 2006 Winter Olympics in the classical 15 kilometre race (53rd), in the sprint race (53rd) and in the team sprint (18th).

After this season he switched to biathlon. At the 10 km sprint of the 2007 Asian Winter Games he finished in 5th place.

External links 
 Tian Ye at Sports-Reference.com

Olympic cross-country skiers of China
Chinese male biathletes
Cross-country skiers at the 2006 Winter Olympics
1982 births
Living people
Sport shooters from Heilongjiang
Asian Games medalists in biathlon
Biathletes at the 2007 Asian Winter Games
Asian Games gold medalists for China
Medalists at the 2007 Asian Winter Games
Skiers from Heilongjiang
21st-century Chinese people